Ladies Love Outlaws is an album by American country music artist Waylon Jennings, released on RCA Nashville in 1972. Together with Jennings' previous album Good Hearted Woman, it marks his transition toward his Outlaw Country image and style. "Ladies Love Outlaws" coined the use of the term "Outlaw" to refer to the country music subgenre, which was developing at the time of its release.

Background
At this time, Jennings was suffering from hepatitis and was hospitalized.  Frustrated by RCA Records' control over him, and thinking that he would have no more hit records, Jennings was considering retiring and, after a long time of deficient work, he fired his manager Lucky Moeller.  During his recovery, his drummer Richie Albright visited him and persuaded Jennings to try again. Meanwhile, his contract with RCA Records was nearing its end. Albright introduced Jennings to Neil Reshen, a New York lawyer who had experience handling bands and contract problems. Jennings engaged Reshen as his manager, who encouraged the singer to grow his hair and beard long to emphasize his "outlaw" image .  Willie Nelson, who Reshen would also go on to manage, recalled later, "These were the days when Waylon was still in the clutches of RCA management that demanded he sing certain songs a certain way.  Neil put a stop to that. He backed down the establishment."  The brash Reshen renegotiated Jennings' deal with RCA Records, and by the time of the agreement, Jennings received complete artistic freedom over producing, recording and selection of material, and the cover art of his albums.  This would set the stage for the "outlaw country" movement that would dominate the industry throughout the 1970s, and Jennings, along with Nelson, Kris Kristofferson, and a handful of other like-minded renegades, would be its figurehead.

Recording
The title of the album originated from the song "Ladies Love Outlaws", written by singer-songwriter Lee Clayton.  The composition mentions Jennings in one of its stanzas, describing his relation with his wife Jessi Colter: "Jessi liked Cadillacs and diamonds on her hands, Waymore had a reputation as a ladies man/Late one night her light of love finally gave a sign, Jessi parked her Cadillac and took her place in line." Clayton proposed that Jennings record the track, and Jennings decided to use it for the title of his next RCA Records release. Jennings' usual producer Chet Atkins was delegating the production of albums to other studio members so he could focus on his career as an artist so he assigned Danny Davis to produce the album. Davis' collaboration with Jennings ended when Jennings grew tired of Davis' conservative restrictions, took a gun into the studio and threatened to "shoot off the fingers" of the producer or any musician who would play a pickup note. Atkins replaced Davis with producer Ronny Light. Recording took place at RCA Victor's Nashville studio through 1971-72, with the exception of "Thanks", which was recorded in 1970. The album's liner notes were written by Los Angeles Times critic Robert Hilburn.

In his autobiography, Jennings said he was dissatisfied with RCA Records' decision to release the album without consulting him and insisted that the recordings of him contained scratch vocals, which he intended to use to help the band obtain a good sound; he had planned on redoing the vocals later. He also said that the label published the unfinished album without asking him about his progress. While he was satisfied with the results of "Frisco Depot" and considered the song complete, he said that Hoyt Axton's "Never Been to Spain" was never planned for a release.  Jennings said, "I still cringe when I hear myself singing 'Never Been to Spain'. It sounded like I'd never even been to Cleveland".

Ladies Love Outlaws and Jennings' previous album Good Hearted Woman marked a change in Jennings' appearance. The cover of Ladies Love Outlaws shows Jennings on a scene set in an Old West motif, dressed in black with a revolver strapped to his waist,looking at his five-year-old niece, Ladonna. Previously, Jennings kept his hair short and his face clean-shaven, and he wore suits. After the release of Ladies Love Outlaws, he started to wear faded jeans and cowboy boots.

In 2013, Ladies Love Outlaws was remastered and made available for download by Legacy Recordings.

Reception

The album was released in September 1972and peaked at number eleven on Billboard's Top Country Albums. The duet with his wife Jessi Colter, "Under Your Spell Again", was released in 1971 as a single; it reached number 39 on Billboard's hot country singles.  Critic Chet Flippo of Rolling Stone wrote a negative review of the album, calling it "vague and unfinished". Jennings liked the review; upon reading it he called Flippo and said that RCA released the album before time without his consent, and invited Flippo to accompany him on his bus during a tour. Author Dean Tudor called the songs on the album "exciting", and wrote that Jennings "finely calculated the art of creating the 'laid back' country sound, and finely complements the forceful, but subdued, instrumentation with vocals that never strain for  dramatic effect". Tudor described the album's style as a "blurred" boundary between country and rock and roll. Thom Jurek of Allmusic gave the album three-and-a-half stars and wrote that Jennings' performances offered him in a "deeply expressive terrain" as a vocalist. Jurek also wrote that Jennings "wrings emotion from songs rather than merely projecting them into a microphone".

Track listing

Personnel

Waylon Jennings - Vocals, Guitar
Ralph Mooney - Steel guitar
Dave Kirby - Guitar
Billy Ray Reynolds -  Guitar
Billy Sanford - Guitar
Jerry Stembridge - Guitar
John "Bucky" Wilkin - Guitar
Bobby Dyson - Bass

Norbert Putnam - Bass
Henry Strzelecki - Bass
Kenny Buttrey - Drums
Buddy Harman - Drums
Larrie Londin - Drums
Hargus "Pig" Robbins - Piano
Jim Pierce - Piano
Richard Powell - Synthesizer

Chart positions

Album

Singles

Footnotes

References

 

 

  

 

1972 albums
RCA Records albums
Waylon Jennings albums